The Derbyshire Royal Infirmary was a hospital in Derby that was managed by the Derby Teaching Hospitals NHS Foundation Trust. Following the transfer of community services to the London Road Community Hospital located further south-east along London Road, the infirmary closed in 2009 and most of the buildings were demolished in spring 2015.

History

Derbyshire General Infirmary
In early 1803, the Reverend Thomas Gisborne and Isaac Hawkins Browne Esq. (Trustees of the late Isaac Hawkins Esq.) signified their intention to appropriate £5,000 towards an infirmary to be erected at Derby.

On 5 April 1803, following a request from the Grand Jury, the High Sheriff of Derby (Robert Wilmot) held a meeting to consider the founding of a hospital in Derby. At this meeting it was noted that subscriptions promised had already reached £17,215, with a further £2,592 and 18 shillings annually.

On 6 October 1803, a committee was appointed consisting of all subscribers of more than £50 and it was decided that the first payment of 25% of more would be required by 12 January 1804.

The infirmary building, principally under the inspiration of the cotton manufacturer, William Strutt, made a deliberate attempt to incorporate into a medical institution the latest “fireproof” building techniques with technology developed for the textile mills. The Infirmary building opened in what is now Bradshaw Way, Derby on 4 June 1810.

Derbyshire Royal Infirmary
In 1890, during the year that he was Mayor of Derby, Sir Alfred Seale Haslam managed to replace the old Derbyshire General Infirmary with the Derbyshire Royal Infirmary. That year there had been an outbreak of disease at the old infirmary and Sir William Evans, President of the Infirmary arranged a three-day inspection which condemned the old building. When Queen Victoria came to lay a foundation stone for the new hospital on 21 May 1891 she knighted Haslam for his services and gave permission for the term "Royal" to be used. The new Derbyshire Royal Infirmary, designed by the architects Young and Hall, was completed and officially opened in 1894.

In the 2000's most services were gradually transferred to the new Royal Derby Hospital, leaving only community services on the Infirmary site. Following the transfer of the community services to the London Road Community Hospital located further south-east along London Road, the infirmary closed in 2009 and most of buildings were demolished in spring 2015. However a facade with its two "pepper-pot towers" dating back to 1894 was retained for redevelopment.

Nightingale Quarter 
Redevelopment on the former site of the Derby Royal Infirmary started in 2020 after initially being halted due to the coronavirus pandemic. Renamed the 'Nightingale Quarter' - after Florence Nightingale - by developer Wavensmere Homes, the new site covers 18.5 acres and includes 800 new residential properties. With the final houses on the site now launched, construction work has also started on the apartment buildings and restoration of the "pepper-pot towers". In 2022, Wavensmere Homes appointed Joseph Mews Property Group to bring the first release of these apartments - The Pavilion - to market. The "pepper-pot towers" will be turned into on-site amenities for residents including a gym and restaurant, while the existing exteriors will be restored.

Gallery

See also
 List of hospitals in England

References

Hospital buildings completed in 1891
Hospitals in Derby
Defunct hospitals in England
NHS hospitals in England
1891 establishments in England
Hospitals established in 1891
2009 disestablishments in England
Hospitals disestablished in 2009